The following elections occurred in the year 1951:

Africa
 1951 Gambian legislative election
 1951 Gold Coast legislative election
 1951 Liberian general election
 1951 Sierra Leonean legislative election

Asia
 1951–1952 Burmese general election
 India: 
 1951 Indian general election
 1951–1971 Indian general elections
 Indian general election in Madras, 1951
 1951 Israeli legislative election
 1951 Israeli presidential election
 1951 Philippine Senate election
 1951 Singaporean general election
 1951 Soviet Union regional elections

Australia
 1951 Australian federal election
 1951 Australian referendum

Europe
 1951 Austrian presidential election
 1951 Finnish parliamentary election
 1951 French legislative election
 Germany: 1951 Rhineland-Palatinate state election
 1951 Greek legislative election
 1951 Irish general election
 1951 Luxembourgian legislative election
 1951 Maltese general election
 1951 Norwegian local elections
 1951 Soviet Union regional elections
 United Kingdom
 1951 United Kingdom general election
 List of MPs elected in the 1951 United Kingdom general election
 1951 Westhoughton by-election

America
 1951 Argentine general election
 1951 Antigua and Barbuda general election
 Canada
 1951 Edmonton municipal election
 1951 Newfoundland general election
 1951 Northwest Territories general election
 1951 Ontario general election
 1951 Prince Edward Island general election
 1951 Toronto municipal election

See also

 
1951
Elections